Dal: Yma/Nawr is a 2003 Welsh documentary film directed by Marc Evans starring John Cale, Ioan Gruffudd and Rhys Ifans.

Premise 
The documentary focuses on the poetic soul of Wales. It explores poetic responses, historical and contemporary, to the issues of social and cultural survival and it celebrates the 2,000-year odyssey through Europe's oldest surviving bardic tradition.

Cast 
 John Cale
 Ioan Gruffudd
 Rhys Ifans
 Siân Phillips
 Daniel Evans
 Guto Harri
 Nia Roberts
 Cerys Matthews
 Iola Gregory
 Betsan Llwyd
 Cerys Matthews
 Maureen Rhys

References

External links 
 

2003 films
2003 documentary films
Welsh films
Welsh-language films
British documentary films
Documentary films about poets
Welsh culture
Films directed by Marc Evans
2000s British films